Oh Ah! is Stereo Total's debut album released in 1995.

Track listing

"Dactylo Rock" – 2.32
"C'est la mort" – 2.50
"Miau Miau" – 2.01
"Comme un garçon" – 2.39
"Belami" – 2.10
"Johnny" – 1.56
"Morose" – 2.09
"Je suis venu te dire que je m'en vais" – 3.06
"Push It" – 0.58
"Souvenir Souvenir" – 1.28
"Auf dem blauen Meer" – 1.48
"Moviestar" – 2.19
"À l'amour comme à la guerre" – 3.04
"Get Down Tonight" – 2.38
"Dans le parc" – 4.36
"Epitaph" – 1.07
"Moi je joue" – 1.39

References

1995 debut albums
Stereo Total albums